Longaker is a surname of Norwegian or Danish origin. Notable people with the surname include:

Christine Longaker, American pioneer in the hospice movement
Richard Longaker (1924–2018), American political scientist

References

Surnames of Norwegian origin
Surnames of Danish origin